The Lake Tanganyika sprat (Stolothrissa tanganicae) is a species of fish in the family Clupeidae. It is monotypic within the genus Stolothrissa. It is found in Burundi, the Democratic Republic of the Congo, Tanzania, and Zambia. Its natural habitat is freshwater lakes. It and the Lake Tanganyika sardine are known collectively as kapenta.

References

Lake Tanganyika sprat
Fish of Lake Tanganyika
Lake Tanganyika sprat
Taxonomy articles created by Polbot